Mount Sinai Simi Valley is a Jewish cemetery located at 6150 Mount Sinai Drive, in Simi Valley, California; which opened in 1997.

History 
Mount Sinai Simi Valley was a sister property to Mount Sinai Hollywood Hills when members of the Cemetery Management Committee of Sinai Temple (Los Angeles) identified the need for Jewish burial properties for future generations. 

Mount Sinai Simi Valley sits on 150 acres of land in the Santa Susana Pass which ensures that there will be available burial space to accommodate the needs for the Los Angeles Jewish community for the next 250 years. A notable section within Mount Sinai Simi Valley is the Caves of Abraham, which is a series of graves that though they appear to be built above ground are actually built directly in to the hillside. The section received the approval from the Chief Rabbinate of Israel for meeting standards of acceptability according to Jewish practice and it is the only place outside of Israel where a person can receive a genuine cave burial.

Notable interments

 Warren Berlinger (1937–2020), actor
 Hy Cohen (1931–2021), baseball player and coach
 Jack DeLeon (1924–2006), comedic actor
 Alison Greenspan (1972–2021), movie and tv producer
 Betty Lou Keim (1938–2010), actress
 Bobby Mallon (1919–2008), actor, one of the Little Rascals
 Norman Powell (1934–2021), tv producer
 Carl Reiner (1922–2020), actor, director, comedian                                                                                                                                                          
 Estelle Reiner (1914–2008), actress, singer                                                                                                                                                          
 Tom Sherak (1945–2014), actor and producer
 Mark Turenshine (1944–2016), American-Israeli basketball player
 Heidi Weisel (1961–2021), fashion designer

References

External links
 
 

Burials in Ventura County, California
Jewish cemeteries in California
Jews and Judaism in Los Angeles
Simi Valley, California
1997 establishments in California
Cemeteries in Ventura County, California